Renato Ricci (born 1 February 1940) is a former Australian rules footballer who played with Richmond in the Victorian Football League (VFL).

Renato Ricci was a rover who played in the Richmond Under 19 Premiership team in 1958 with his identical twin brother, Lidio Ricci. After missing the entire 1959 season due to injury, Ricci played two games with the Richmond senior team in 1960 before transferring to VFA club Oakleigh in 1961.

Notes

External links 

Renato Ricci's playing statistics from The VFA Project

Living people
1940 births
Australian rules footballers from Victoria (Australia)
Richmond Football Club players
Oakleigh Football Club players